Damjan Pavlović (born 9 July 2001) is a professional footballer who plays as a midfielder for Degerfors IF on loan from Rijeka. Born in Belgium, he represents Serbia at under-21 international level.

Personal life
Born in Belgium, Pavlovic is of Serbian descent.

Career statistics

Club

References

2001 births
Living people
People from Eupen
Footballers from Liège Province
Belgian footballers
Belgium youth international footballers
Serbian footballers
Belgian people of Serbian descent
Association football midfielders
K.A.S. Eupen players
Standard Liège players
HNK Rijeka players
Degerfors IF players
Belgian Pro League players
Serbia under-21 international footballers
Serbian expatriate footballers
Expatriate footballers in Sweden
Serbian expatriate sportspeople in Sweden